Roger Claessen (27 September 1941 – 3 October 1982) was a Belgian footballer who played as a forward. He finished as the top scorer of the Belgian League with 20 goals (along with Paul Van Himst) in 1968 while playing for Standard Liège. He played 17 times with the Belgium national team between 1961 and 1968, scoring seven goals. Claessen made his international debut on 20 May 1961 in a 2–1 defeat to Switzerland, and he scored.

Due to his lifestyle, he was nicknamed "Roger-La honte" (Roger-the shame). He played for other teams, like Alemannia Aachen Beerschot and Crossing Schaarbeek before retiring from football in 1974.

Claessen died aged 41.

He was voted Standard Liège player of the century by supporters.

Honours 
Standard Liège
 Belgian First Division: 1960–61, 1962–63
 Belgian Cup: 1965–66, 1966–67
 European Cup: 1961–62 (semi-finals)

Beerschot
 Belgian Cup: 1970–71

Individual
 European Cup Winners Cup top scorer: 1966–67 (ten goals)

References

External links 
 Profile at Standard Liège

1941 births
1982 deaths
People from Dalhem
Footballers from Liège Province
Belgian footballers
Association football forwards
Belgium international footballers
Standard Liège players
Alemannia Aachen players
K. Beerschot V.A.C. players
Belgian Pro League players
Bundesliga players
Belgian football managers
K.V.V. Crossing Elewijt players
Belgian expatriate footballers
Belgian expatriate sportspeople in Germany
Expatriate footballers in Germany